Washington Apple Health is the Medicaid and State Children's Health Insurance Programs offered in Washington state. The program was initiated January 1, 2014. It was preceded in 2008 by a children's health plan run by the Washington State Department of Social and Health Services called "Apple Health for Kids". In 2016, the plan was ordered by a Federal district court judge to include a coverage treatment with a certain drug for Hepatitis C to all  28,000 patients with the disease, not only those who qualified based on degree of liver damage.

References

External links
 

 Apple Health
Children's health in the United States